Ancient Egyptian technology describes devices and technologies invented or used in Ancient Egypt. The Egyptians invented and used many simple machines, such as the ramp and the lever, to aid construction processes. They used rope trusses to stiffen the beam of ships. Egyptian paper, made from papyrus, and pottery were mass-produced and exported throughout the Mediterranean Basin. The wheel was used for a number of purposes, but chariots only came into use after the Second Intermediate Period. The Egyptians also played an important role in developing Mediterranean maritime technology including ships and lighthouses.

Technology in Dynastic Egypt
Significant advances in ancient Egypt during the dynastic period include astronomy, mathematics, and medicine. Their geometry was a necessary outgrowth of surveying to preserve the layout and ownership of fertile farmland, which was flooded annually by the Nile River. The 3,4,5 right triangle and other rules of thumb served to represent rectilinear structures, and the post and lintel architecture of Egypt. Egypt also was a center of alchemy research for much of the western world.

Paper, writing and libraries

The word paper comes from the Greek term for the ancient Egyptian writing material called papyrus, which was formed from beaten strips of papyrus plants. Papyrus was produced in Egypt as early as 3000 BC and was sold to ancient Greece and Rome. The establishment of the Library of Alexandria limited the supply of papyrus for others. According to the Roman historian Pliny the Elder (Natural History records, xiii.21), as a result of this, parchment was invented under the patronage of Eumenes II of Pergamon to build his rival library at Pergamon. However, this is a myth; parchment had been in use in Anatolia and elsewhere long before the rise of Pergamon.

Egyptian hieroglyphs, a phonetic writing system, served as the basis for the Phoenician alphabet from which later alphabets, such as Hebrew, Greek, and Latin were derived. With this ability, writing and record-keeping, the Egyptians developed one of the – if not the – first decimal system.

The city of Alexandria retained preeminence for its records and scrolls with its library. This ancient library was damaged by fire when it fell under Roman rule, and was destroyed completely by 642 CE. With it, a vast supply of antique literature, history, and knowledge was lost.

Structures and construction

Materials and tools
Some of the older materials used in the construction of Egyptian housing included reeds and clay. According to Lucas and Harris, "reeds were plastered with clay in order to keep out of heat and cold more effectually". Tools that were used were "limestone, chiseled stones, wooden mallets, and stone hammers". With these tools, ancient Egyptians were able to create more than just housing, but also sculptures of their gods.

Buildings
Many Egyptian temples are not standing today. Some are in ruin from wear and tear, while others have been lost entirely. The Egyptian structures are among the largest constructions ever conceived and built by humans. They constitute one of the most potent and enduring symbols of ancient Egyptian civilization. Temples and tombs built by a pharaoh famous for her projects, Hatshepsut, were massive and included many colossal statues of her. Pharaoh Tutankamun's rock-cut tomb in the Valley of the Kings was full of jewelry and antiques. In some late myths, Ptah was identified as the primordial mound and had called creation into being, he was considered the deity of craftsmen, and in particular, of stone-based crafts. Imhotep, who was included in the Egyptian pantheon, was the first documented engineer.

In Hellenistic Egypt, lighthouse technology was developed, the most famous example being the Lighthouse of Alexandria. Alexandria was a port for the ships that traded the goods manufactured in Egypt or imported into Egypt. A giant cantilevered hoist lifted cargo to and from ships. The lighthouse itself was designed by Sostratus of Cnidus and built in the 3rd century BC (between 285 and 247 BC) on the island of Pharos in Alexandria, Egypt, which has since become a peninsula. This lighthouse was renowned in its time and knowledge of it was never lost.

Monuments

The Nile valley has been the site of one of the most influential civilizations in the world with its architectural monuments, which include the Giza pyramid complex and the Great Sphinx.

The most famous pyramids are the Egyptian pyramids—huge structures built of brick or stone, some of which are among the largest constructions by humans. Pyramids functioned as tombs for pharaohs. In Ancient Egypt, a pyramid was referred to as mer, literally "place of ascendance." The Great Pyramid of Giza is the largest in Egypt and one of the largest in the world. It is one of the Seven Wonders of the Ancient World and the only one of the seven to survive into modern times. The ancient Egyptians capped the peaks of their pyramids with gold plated pyramidions and covered their faces with polished white limestone, although many of the stones used for the finishing purpose have fallen or been removed for use on other structures over the millennia.

The Red Pyramid (c.26th century BC), named for the light crimson hue of its exposed granite surfaces, is the third largest of Egyptian pyramids. Menkaure's Pyramid, likely dating to the same era, was constructed of limestone and granite blocks. The Great Pyramid of Giza (c. 2580 BC) contains a huge sarcophagus fashioned of red Aswan granite. The mostly ruined Black Pyramid dating from the reign of Amenemhat III once had a polished granite pyramidion or capstone, now on display in the main hall of the Egyptian Museum in Cairo. Other uses in Ancient Egypt include columns, door lintels, sills, jambs, and wall and floor veneer.

The ancient Egyptians had some of the first monumental stone buildings (such as in Saqqara). How the Egyptians worked the solid granite is still a matter of debate. Archaeologist Patrick Hunt has postulated that the Egyptians used emery shown to have higher hardness on the Mohs scale. Regarding construction, of the various methods possibly used by builders, the lever moved and uplifted obelisks weighing more than 100 tons.

Obelisks and pillars

Obelisks were a prominent part of the Ancient Egyptian architecture, placed in pairs at the entrances of various monuments and important buildings such as temples. In 1902, Encyclopædia Britannica wrote: "The earliest temple obelisk still in position is that of Senusret I of the XIIth Dynasty at Heliopolis (68 feet high)". The word obelisk is of Greek rather than Egyptian origin because Herodotus, the great traveler, was the first writer to describe the objects. Twenty-nine ancient Egyptian obelisks are known to have survived, plus the Unfinished obelisk being built by Hatshepsut to celebrate her sixteenth year as pharaoh. It broke while being carved out of the quarry and was abandoned when another one was begun to replace it. The broken one was found at Aswan and provides some of the only insight into the methods of how they were hewn. 

The obelisk symbolized the sky deity Ra and during the brief religious reformation of Akhenaten was said to be a petrified ray of the Aten, the sun disk. It is hypothesized by New York University Egyptologist Patricia Blackwell Gary and Astronomy senior editor Richard Talcott that the shapes of the ancient Egyptian pyramid and obelisk were derived from natural phenomena associated with the sun (the sun-god Ra being the Egyptians' greatest deity). It was also thought that the deity existed within the structure. The Egyptians also used pillars extensively.

It is unknown whether the ancient Egyptians had kites, but a team led by Maureen Clemmons and Mory Gharib raised a 5,900-pound,  obelisk into vertical position with a kite, a system of pulleys, and a support frame. Maureen Clemmons developed the idea that the ancient Egyptians used kites for work. 

Ramps have been reported as being widely used in Ancient Egypt. A ramp is an inclined plane, or a plane surface set at an angle (other than a right angle) against a horizontal surface. The inclined plane permits one to overcome a large resistance by applying a relatively small force through a longer distance than the load is to be raised. In civil engineering the slope (ratio of rise/run) is often referred to as a grade or gradient. An inclined plane is one of the commonly-recognized simple machines. Maureen Clemmons subsequently led a team of researchers demonstrating a kite made of natural material and reinforced with shellac (which according to their research pulled with 97% the efficiency of nylon), in a 9 mph wind, would easily pull an average 2-ton pyramid stone up the 1st two courses of a pyramid (in collaboration with Cal Poly, Pomona, on a 53-stone pyramid built in Rosamond, CA).

Navigation and ship building

The ancient Egyptians had knowledge to some extent of sail construction. This is governed by the science of aerodynamics. The earliest Egyptian sails were simply placed to catch the wind and push a vessel. Later Egyptian sails dating to 2400 BC were built with the recognition that ships could sail against the wind using the lift of the sails. Queen Hatshepsut oversaw the preparations and funding of an expedition of five ships, each measuring seventy feet long, and with several sails.Various others exist, also.

The ancient Egyptians had experience with building a variety of ships. Some of them survive to this day as Khufu ship. The ships were found in many areas of Egypt as the Abydos boats and remnants of other ships were found near the pyramids.

Sneferu's ancient cedar wood ship Praise of the Two Lands is the first reference recorded to a ship being referred to by name.

Although quarter rudders were the norm in Nile navigation, the Egyptians were the first to use also stern-mounted rudders (not of the modern type but center mounted steering oars).

The first warships of Ancient Egypt were constructed during the early Middle Kingdom and perhaps at the end of the Old Kingdom, but the first mention and a detailed description of a large enough and heavily armed ship dates from 16th century BC.
 

When Thutmose III achieved warships displacement up to 360 tons and carried up to ten new heavy and light to seventeen catapults based bronze springs, called "siege crossbow" – more precisely, siege bows. Still appeared giant catamarans that are heavy warships and times of Ramesses III used even when the Ptolemaic dynasty.

According to the Greek historian Herodotus, Necho II sent out an expedition of Phoenicians, which reputedly, at some point between 610 and before 594 BC, sailed in three years  from the Red Sea around Africa to the mouth of the Nile. Some Egyptologists dispute that an Egyptian pharaoh would authorize such an expedition, except for the reason of trade in the ancient maritime routes.

The belief in Herodotus' account, handed down to him by oral tradition, is primarily because he stated with disbelief that the Phoenicians "as they sailed on a westerly course round the southern end of Libya (Africa), they had the sun on their right – to northward of them" (The Histories 4.42) – in Herodotus' time it was not generally known that Africa was surrounded by an ocean (with the southern part of Africa being thought connected to Asia). So fantastic an assertion is this of a typical example of some seafarers' story and Herodotus therefore may never have mentioned it at all, had it not been based on facts and made with the according insistence.

This early description of Necho's expedition as a whole is contentious, though; it is recommended that one keep an open mind on the subject, but Strabo, Polybius, and Ptolemy doubted the description. Egyptologist A. B. Lloyd suggests that the Greeks at this time understood that anyone going south far enough and then turning west would have the Sun on their right but found it unbelievable that Africa reached so far south. He suggests that "It is extremely unlikely that an Egyptian king would, or could, have acted as Necho is depicted as doing" and that the story might have been triggered by the failure of Sataspes' attempt to circumnavigate Africa under Xerxes the Great. Regardless, it was believed by Herodotus and Pliny.

Much earlier, the Sea Peoples was a confederacy of seafaring raiders who sailed into the eastern shores of the Mediterranean, caused political unrest and attempted to enter or control Egyptian territory during the late 19th Dynasty, and especially during Year 8 of Ramesses III of the 20th Dynasty. The Egyptian Pharaoh Merneptah explicitly refers to them by the term "the foreign-countries (or 'peoples') of the sea" in his Great Karnak Inscription.  Although some scholars believe that they "invaded" Cyprus and the Levant, this hypothesis is disputed.

Irrigation and agriculture

Irrigation as the artificial application of water to the soil was used to some extent in ancient Egypt, a hydraulic civilization (which entails hydraulic engineering). In crop production it is mainly used to replace missing rainfall in periods of drought, as opposed to reliance on direct rainfall (referred to as dryland farming or as rainfed farming). Before technology advanced, the people of Egypt relied on the natural flow of the Nile River to tend to the crops. Although the Nile provided sufficient watering for the survival of domesticated animals, crops, and the people of Egypt, there were times where the Nile would flood the area wreaking havoc across the land. There is evidence of the ancient Egyptian pharaoh Amenemhet III in the Twelfth Dynasty (about 1800 BC) using the natural lake of the Fayûm as a reservoir to store surpluses of water for use during the dry seasons, as the lake swelled annually with the flooding of the Nile. Construction of drainage canals reduced the problems of major flooding from entering homes and areas of crops; but because it was a hydraulic civilization, much of the water management was controlled in a systematic way.

Glassworking

The earliest known glass beads from Egypt were made during the New Kingdom around 1500 BC and were produced in a variety of colors. They were made by winding molten glass around a metal bar and were highly prized as a trading commodity, especially blue beads, which were believed to have magical powers. The Egyptians made small jars and bottles using the core-formed method. Glass threads were wound around a bag of sand tied to a rod. The glass was continually reheated to fuse the threads together. The glass-covered sand bag was kept in motion until the required shape and thickness was achieved. The rod was allowed to cool, then finally the bag was punctured and the sand poured out and reused . The Egyptians also created the first colored glass rods which they used to create colorful beads and decorations. They also worked with cast glass, which was produced by pouring molten glass into a mold, much like iron and the more modern crucible steel.

Astronomy

The Egyptians were a practical people and this is reflected in their astronomy in contrast to Babylonia where the first astronomical texts were written in astrological terms. Even before Upper and Lower Egypt were unified in 3000 BC, observations of the night sky had influenced the development of a religion in which many of its principal deities were heavenly bodies. In Lower Egypt, priests built circular mudbrick walls with which to make a false horizon where they could mark the position of the sun as it rose at dawn, and then with a plumb-bob note the northern or southern turning points (solstices). This allowed them to discover that the sun disc, personified as Ra, took 365 days to travel from his birthplace at the winter solstice and back to it. Meanwhile, in Upper Egypt, a lunar calendar was being developed based on the behavior of the moon and the reappearance of Sirius in its heliacal rising after its annual absence of about 70 days.

After unification, problems with trying to work with two calendars (both depending upon constant observation) led to a merged, simplified civil calendar with twelve 30-day months, three seasons of four months each, plus an extra five days, giving a 365-year day but with no way of accounting for the extra quarter day each year. Day and night were split into 24 units, each personified by a deity. A sundial found on Seti I's cenotaph with instructions for its use shows us that the daylight hours were at one time split into 10 units, with 12 hours for the night and an hour for the morning and evening twilights. However, by Seti I's time day and night were normally divided into 12 hours each, the length of which would vary according to the time of year.

Key to much of this was the motion of the sun god Ra and his annual movement along the horizon at sunrise. Out of Egyptian myths such as those around Ra and the sky goddess Nut came the development of the Egyptian calendar, time keeping, and even concepts of royalty. An astronomical ceiling in the burial chamber of Ramesses VI shows the sun being born from Nut in the morning, traveling along her body during the day and being swallowed at night.

During the Fifth Dynasty six kings built sun temples in honour of Ra. The temple complexes built by Niuserre at Abu Gurab and Userkaf at Abusir have been excavated and have astronomical alignments, and the roofs of some of the buildings could have been used by observers to view the stars, calculate the hours at night and predict the sunrise for religious festivals.

Claims have been made that precession of the equinoxes was known in ancient Egypt prior to the time of Hipparchus. This has been disputed however on the grounds that pre-Hipparchus texts do not mention precession and that "it is only by cunning interpretation of ancient myths and images, which are ostensibly about something else, that precession can be discerned in them, aided by some pretty esoteric numerological speculation involving the 72 years that mark one degree of shift in the zodiacal system and any number of permutations by multiplication, division, and addition."

Note however that the Egyptian observation of a slowly changing stellar alignment over a multi-year period does not necessarily mean that they understood or even cared what was going on. For instance, from the Middle Kingdom onwards they used a table with entries for each month to tell the time of night from the passing of constellations. These went in error after a few centuries because of their calendar and precession, but were copied (with scribal errors) long after they lost their practical usefulness or the possibility of understanding and use of them in the current years, rather than the years in which they were originally used.

Medicine

The Edwin Smith Papyrus is one of the first medical documents still extant, and perhaps the earliest document which attempts to describe and analyze the brain: given this, it might be seen as the very beginnings of neuroscience. However, medical historians believe that ancient Egyptian pharmacology was largely ineffective. According to a paper published by Michael D. Parkins, 72% of 260 medical prescriptions in the Hearst papyrus had no curative elements. According to Michael D. Parkins, sewage pharmacology first began in ancient Egypt and was continued through the Middle Ages, and while the use of animal dung can have curative properties, it is not without its risk. Practices such as applying cow dung to wounds, ear piercing, tattooing, and chronic ear infections were important factors in developing tetanus. Frank J. Snoek wrote that Egyptian medicine used fly specks, lizard blood, swine teeth, and other such remedies which he believes could have been harmful.

Mummification of the dead was not always practiced in Egypt. Once the practice began, an individual was placed at a final resting place through a set of rituals and protocol. The Egyptian funeral was a complex ceremony including various monuments, prayers, and rituals undertaken in honor of the deceased. The poor, who could not afford expensive tombs, were buried in shallow graves in the sand, and because of the arid environment they were often naturally mummified.

The wheel
Evidence indicates that Egyptians made use of potter's wheels in the manufacturing of pottery from as early as the 4th Dynasty (c. 2613 to 2494 BC). Chariots, however, are only believed to have been introduced by the invasion of the Hyksos in the Second Intermediate Period (c.1650 BC to c.1550 BC); during the New Kingdom era (c.1550 BC to c.1077 BC), chariotry became central to Egypt's military.

Other developments
The Egyptians developed a variety of furniture. There in the lands of ancient Egypt is the first evidence for stools, beds, and tables (such as from the tombs similar to Tutankhamun's). Recovered Ancient Egyptian furniture includes a third millennium BC bed discovered in the Tarkhan Tomb, a c.2550 BC. gilded set from the tomb of Queen Hetepheres I, and a c. 1550 BC. stool from Thebes.

Some have suggested that the Egyptians had some form of understanding electric phenomena from observing lightning and interacting with electric fish (such as Malapterurus electricus) or other animals (such as electric eels). The comment about lightning appears to come from a misunderstanding of a text referring to "high poles covered with copper plates" to argue this but Dr. Bolko Stern has written in detail explaining why the copper covered tops of poles (which were lower than the associated pylons) do not relate to electricity or lightning, pointing out that no evidence of anything used to manipulate electricity had been found in Egypt and that this was a magical and not a technical installation.

Later technology in Egypt

Greco-Roman Egypt

Under Hellenistic rule, Egypt was one of the most prosperous regions of the Hellenistic civilization. The ancient Egyptian city of Rhakotis was renovated as Alexandria, which became the largest city around the Mediterranean Basin. Under Roman rule, Egypt was one of the most prosperous regions of the Roman Empire, with Alexandria being second only to ancient Rome in size.

Recent scholarship suggests that the water wheel originates from Ptolemaic Egypt, where it appeared by the 3rd century BC. This is seen as an evolution of the paddle-driven water-lifting wheels that had been known in Egypt a century earlier. According to John Peter Oleson, both the compartmented wheel and the hydraulic noria may have been invented in Egypt by the 4th century BC, with the Sakia being invented there a century later. This is supported by archeological finds at Faiyum, Egypt, where the oldest archeological evidence of a water-wheel has been found, in the form of a Sakia dating back to the 3rd century BC. A papyrus dating to the 2nd century BC also found in Faiyum mentions a water wheel used for irrigation, a 2nd-century BC fresco found at Alexandria depicts a compartmented Sakia, and the writings of Callixenus of Rhodes mention the use of a Sakia in Ptolemaic Egypt during the reign of Ptolemy IV in the late 3rd century BC.

Ancient Greek technology was often inspired by the need to improve weapons and tactics in war. Ancient Roman technology is a set of artifacts and customs which supported Roman civilization and made the expansion of Roman commerce and Roman military possible over nearly a thousand years.

Arabic-Islamic Egypt

Under Arab rule, Egypt once again became one of the most prosperous regions around the Mediterranean. The Egyptian city of Cairo was founded by the Fatimid Caliphate and served as its capital city. At the time, Cairo was second only to Baghdad, capital of the rival Abbasid Caliphate. After the fall of Baghdad, however, Cairo overtook it as the largest city in the Mediterranean region until the early modern period.

Inventions in medieval Islam covers the inventions developed in the medieval Islamic world, a region that extended from Al-Andalus and Africa in the west to the Indian subcontinent and Central Asia in the east. The timeline of Islamic science and engineering covers the general development of science and technology in the Islamic world.

See also

 List of Egyptian inventions and discoveries
 Ancient Egyptian units of measurement
 Egyptian chronology
 History of science in early cultures
 Astrology and astronomy
 History of technology

Notes

References
 Leslie C. Kaplan, "Technology of Ancient Egypt. 2004, 24 pages. 
 Denys Allen Stocks "Experiments in Egyptian Archaeology: Stoneworking Technology in Ancient Egypt". Routledge, 2003. 336 pages. 
 Katheryn A. Bard" Encyclopedia of the Archaeology of Ancient Egypt By Katheryn A. Bard". Routledge, 1999. 968 pages. 
 R. J. Forbes, "Studies in Ancient Technology". 1966.
 Örjan Wikander, "Handbook of Ancient Water Technology". 2000.
 
 Evans, James. The History and Practice of Ancient Astronomy. New York: Oxford University Press, 1998.
 Pannekoek, A. A History of Astronomy. New York: Dover, 1961.
 
 Budge, E. A. Wallis. Egyptian Religion. Kessinger Publishing, 1900.
 Budge, E. A. Wallis. The Gods of the Egyptians Volume 1 of 2. New York: Dover Publications, 1969 (original in 1904).

Further reading
 Anzovin, Steven et al., Famous First Facts (International Edition), H. W. Wilson Company, 2000, 
 
 
 
 Lucas, Alfred. 1962. Ancient Egyptian Materials and Industries, 4th Edition. London: Edward Arnold Publishers.
 
 Nicholson, Paul T. and Ian Shaw, eds. 2000. Ancient Egyptian Materials and Technology. University Press, Cambridge.
 
 Scheel, Bernd. 1989. Egyptian Metalworking and Tools. Haverfordwest, Great Britain: Shire Publications Ltd.
 Shaw, Ian. Editor. 2000. The Oxford History of Ancient Egypt. Oxford: Oxford University Press.
 
 Davis, Virginia. "Mines and Quarries of Ancient Egypt, an Introduction" Online article
 Institutt for Arkeologi, Kunsthistorie og Konservering website, in English at 

 
Technology
Technology by period
Egyptian inventions
Science and technology in Egypt